Dame Katharine Henrietta Jones  & Bar (3 February 1888 – 29 December 1967) was Matron-in-Chief of Queen Alexandra's Imperial Military Nursing Service (QAIMNS) for most of the Second World War, serving from 23 July 1940 to 1944.

During the First World War, she trained as a nurse at St Bartholomew's Hospital, London, later joining Queen Alexandra's Imperial Military Nursing Service (QAIMNS) in 1917, which she rejoined in 1937. Jones was mentioned in despatches, while serving in Palestine. In 1938, she returned to Britain where she was appointed the Principal Matron at the War Office.

In 1939, the Second World War was declared and Jones mobilised more than 1000 QAs to France to serve with the British Expeditionary Force (BEF). Along with the British Army the QAs retreated from Dunkirk on 26 May 1940; all were safely returned to England. In July 1940, aged 44, Jones was promoted to Matron in Chief of the QAIMNS.

As Matron in Chief of the QAIMNS, Jones wrote the introduction to Grey and Scarlet, a collection of letters sent to her by Nursing Sisters of the Queen Alexandra's Imperial Military Nursing Service and Territorial Army Nursing Service from France, Iceland, Tobruk, Sudan, Eritrea, Gibraltar, Greece, Middle East, North Africa, Malta, Malaya and Singapore.

Death
She died at St. Mary's Guest House, Burlington Lane, Chiswick, London, on 29 December 1967.

References

External links
 Notice of Jones' appointment to the RRC, Supplement to the London Gazette, 8 June 1944

1888 births
1967 deaths
British nursing administrators
Dames Commander of the Order of the British Empire
British Army personnel of World War II
Nurses from London
Queen Alexandra's Royal Army Nursing Corps officers
British Army personnel of World War I
British women in World War I
British women in World War II
Members of the Royal Red Cross